(born 16 September 1988 in Kanagawa Prefecture), stage name  is a Japanese actress, tarento and gravure idol.

Life
Hanako graduated from Horikoshi High School. She is represented with Tristone Entertainment Inc. Hanako's mother is Yumi Takigawa, who is also an actress, and her father was Shinsuke Achiha, former president of Actors Promotion.

Filmography

Films

TV dramas

TV programmes

Journey programmes

Advertisements

Stills

Others

Bibliography

Photo albums

DVD

Calendars

References

Notes

Sources

External links
 
 at Tristone Entertainment Inc. 

1988 births
Living people
Actresses from Kanagawa Prefecture
Horikoshi High School alumni
Japanese television personalities
Japanese gravure idols